The 1903 TCU football team represented Texas Christian University (TCU) as an independent during the 1903 college football season. TCU finished the season 0–7 overall. They played their home games in Waco, Texas.

Schedule

References

TCU
TCU Horned Frogs football seasons
College football winless seasons
TCU football